Davy Crockett National Forest in Kennard, Texas is off U.S. Highway 69 lying west of Lufkin, Texas and east of Crockett. It is administered by the United States Department of Agriculture Forest Service local headquarters in Lufkin. There are local ranger district offices located in Ratcliff.

Davy Crockett National Forest, which is bordered on the northeast by the Neches Riverand is located in Kennard, Texas, includes the  Ratcliff Lake. The area is pine-hardwood woodlands with flat to gently rolling terrain.

Uses
The national forest is managed on a multiple-use philosophy and are used for lumbering, grazing, oil production, hunting, and recreation. In fiscal year 1994, 93.8 million board feet of timber was harvested from the national forests in Texas, providing 2,098 jobs and $73,108,000 in income to the surrounding Texas communities. In addition, Texas ranchers with special permits could graze their cattle in the national forests. At the Davy Crockett National Forest, 386 head of cattle grazed in fiscal year 1994.

Recreational facilities within the national forest at the Ratcliff Lake Recreation Area include a bathhouse, camping, picnicking and swimming areas, boat ramps, and hiking trails. The Big Slough Wilderness also lies within the forest.

See also
Texas Forest Trail
National Forests of Texas
List of U.S. National Forests

References

External links
 Davy Crockett National Forest USDA Forest Service - National Forests & Grasslands in Texas
 Davy Crockett National Forest from the Handbook of Texas Online.
 

National Forests of Texas
Protected areas of Houston County, Texas
Protected areas of Trinity County, Texas
Davy Crockett
1936 establishments in Texas
Protected areas established in 1936